The Denver Nuggets are an American professional basketball team based in Denver, Colorado. They play in the Northwest Division of the Western Conference in the National Basketball Association (NBA). The Nuggets were founded as the Denver Rockets of the American Basketball Association (ABA) in 1967. In 1974, in anticipation of moving to the NBA, the franchise held a contest to choose a new trademarked name for the team, as Rockets was already in use by the Houston Rockets and the name Nuggets won. In 1976, the ABA folded, and the NBA decided to admit four ABA teams into the league, including the Nuggets, the San Antonio Spurs, the Indiana Pacers and the New York Nets.

There have been 22 head coaches for the Nuggets franchise. The franchise's first head coach was Bob Bass, who led the team to the division semifinals, losing to the New Orleans Buccaneers. Doug Moe and George Karl were the only Nuggets coaches to win the NBA Coach of the Year Award. . Moe is the franchise's all-time leader in both regular season and playoff games coached and wins. Larry Brown & George Karl are the only Nuggets coaches to be inducted into the Basketball Hall of Fame, although John McLendon was inducted as a contributor, but not a coach. In 1976, Brown coached the Nuggets to the team's only ABA championship game. John McLendon, Joe Belmont, Donnie Walsh, Dan Issel, Bill Hanzlik, Mike Evans, Jeff Bzdelik, Michael Cooper, and Brian Shaw spent their entire NBA coaching careers with the Nuggets.Michael Malone is the current head coach.

Key

Coaches

Notes
 A running total of the number of coaches of the Nuggets. Thus any coach who has two or more separate terms as head coach is only counted once.
 Each year is linked to an article about that particular NBA season, except for the seasons spent in the ABA.

References
General

Specific

Lists of National Basketball Association head coaches by team

Head coaches